Treybal is a Czech surname. Notable people with the surname include:

 František Treybal (1882–1947), Czech chess master
 Igor Treybal (born 1930), Czech sports shooter
 Karel Treybal (1885–1941), Czech chess player, brother of František

Czech-language surnames